The 2016 Boels Rental Ladies Tour also known as the 2016 Holland Ladies Tour is the 19th edition of the Holland Ladies Tour, a women's cycle stage race held in the Netherlands. The tour is part of the 2016 women's road cycling calendar and is held from 30 August to 4 September. The tour has six stages, including a team time trial. The tour starts in Tiel and concludes with a stage in Valkenburg. The tour has an UCI rating of 2.1.

Stages

Stage 1
30 August – Tiel to Tiel,

Stage 2
31 August – Gennep to Gennep (Team time trial),

Stage 3
1 September – Sittard-Geleen to Sittard-Geleen,

Stage 4
2 September – 's-Hertogenbosch to 's-Hertogenbosch

Stage 5
3 September – Tiel to Tiel,

Stage 6
4 September – Bunde to Valkenburg,

Classification leadership

See also

 2016 in women's road cycling

References

External links
 

Boels Rental Ladies Tour
Boels Rental Ladies Tour
Holland Ladies Tour
Cycling in North Brabant
Cycling in Gennep
Cycling in Meerssen
Cycling in Sittard-Geleen
Cycling in Tiel
Cycling in Valkenburg aan de Geul
Sports competitions in 's-Hertogenbosch